Axiata Group Berhad, commonly known as Axiata, formerly known as TM International Berhad, is a Malaysian multinational telecommunications conglomerate with extensive operations in Asia.

The group 
Axiata's primary business is in investment holding and the provision of telecommunication and consultancy services on an international scale. Their main focus being emerging markets in ASEAN and South Asia.

Formerly known as TM International Bhd (TMI), the company was incorporated on 12 June 1992 and was the mobile and international operations arm of Telekom Malaysia Bhd (TM). Following the de-merger of TMI from TM, the company was listed on the Main Board of Bursa Malaysia Securities Berhad in 2008. On 2 April 2009, TMI underwent a rebranding exercise, launching its new name, Axiata, and a new logo.

Their new tagline, Advancing Asia, was also launched, reflecting the direction of the company in focusing their expansion within Asia.

Axiata has controlling interests in mobile operators in Malaysia, Nepal, Indonesia, Sri Lanka, Bangladesh and Cambodia. The Group also has stakes in non-mobile telecommunication operations in Thailand and Pakistan.

Their Board of Directors contains:
 Tan Sri Shahril Ridza Ridzuan - Chairman, Independent Non-Executive Director
 Dato Dr Nik Ramlah Nik Mahmood - Senior Independent Non-Executive Director
 Dr David Robert Dean - Independent Non-Executive Director
 Khoo Gaik Bee - Independent Non-Executive Director
 Thayaparan S Sangarapillai - Independent Non-Executive Director
 Tan Sri Dr Halim Shafie - Independent Non-Executive Director
 Ong King How - Non-Independent Non-Executive Director, Representative of Khazanah
 Syed Ali Syed Salem Alsagoff - Non-Independent Non-Executive Director, Representative of Permodalan Nasional Berhad
 Nurhisham Hussein -  Non-Independent Non-Executive Director, Representative of Employees Provident Fund

Subsidiary holdings 
In their website in 2019, it was announced that Axiata had approximately 150 million subscribers across Asia and Group revenue of MYR25.3 billion (US$5.77 billion) in 2018. It was also reported that the company employed 12,000 people in eleven countries.

Axiata's mobile subsidiaries and associates operate under the brand name 'Celcom' in Malaysia, 'XL' in Indonesia, 'Dialog' in Sri Lanka, 'Robi' in Bangladesh, 'Smart' in Cambodia, 'Ncell' in Nepal (acquisition from TeliaSonera completed on 12 April 2016), and until recently, 'M1' in Singapore. On 15 February 2019, Axiata sold off its entire shares in 'M1' to Konnectivity Pte Ltd for RM1.65 billion, citing the need for capital reallocation and new priorities in line with its vision to be the Next Generation Digital Champion by 2022.

On 4 January 2018, Bloomberg reported that Axiata is planning a domestic IPO of its tower subsidiary edotco. The IPO is expected to raise as much as $500 million.

On 21 June 2021, Axiata, Telenor and Digi agree to a potential merger of Celcom and Digi to create a stronger telco in Malaysia, coming after advanced discussions that took place two months earlier. If approved, the merger will be completed by the end of 2022. The deal was approved by both Celcom and Digi shareholders on 18 November 2022. The merged company is named CelcomDigi. At completion, Axiata and Telenor will hold equal ownership of 33.1% each in the newly merged company. The merger was completed on 30 November 2022 and the company began its operation the next day.

Competitors
Axiata Group meets main competitors across the Indonesian market (Telkomsel). In 2019, Axiata held second place in Indonesia. In Bangladesh, Axiata (Robi) also held second place, and the main competitor is Telenor (Grameenphone).

References

External links 
 

 
Malaysian companies established in 1992
2008 initial public offerings
Government-owned companies of Malaysia
Companies listed on Bursa Malaysia
Telecommunications companies of Malaysia
Telecommunications companies established in 1992
Mobile phone companies of Malaysia
Multinational companies headquartered in Malaysia
Companies based in Kuala Lumpur
Corporate spin-offs
Malaysian brands
Khazanah Nasional
Permodalan Nasional Berhad
Employees Provident Fund (Malaysia)